ARA Almirante Storni (P-53) is the third Gowind-class offshore patrol vessel constructed for the Argentinian Navy.

The French Shipbuilder Naval Group launched the hull of ARA Almirante Storni on 10 May 2021 at Lanester, before moving it to Concarneau for fitting out. It is the second ship of the Argentine Navy to be named after the former Minister of the Navy and Vice Admiral Segundo Rosa Storni. The first was the  ARA Almirante Storni (D-24).

References

Ships of the Argentine Navy
Ships built in France
2021 ships